Henry Partridge may refer to:

 Henry Partridge (barrister) (died 1803) FRS, see List of Fellows of the Royal Society P,Q,R
 Henry Partridge (MP) for Heytesbury (UK Parliament constituency)